Mareham on the Hill is a village and civil parish about  south-east from the town of Horncastle, Lincolnshire, England.

The parish church is dedicated to All Saints and is a Grade II* listed building dating from the 15th century, although it was restored in 1780 and remodelled in 1804. It is built of green sandstone, limestone and red brick, and is colourwashed.

The ecclesiastical parish is Mareham on the Hill, part of The Fen and Hill Group of the Deanery of Horncastle. The 2013 incumbent is Rev Canon Alec Boyd.

Mareham Grange farmhouse is a Grade II listed 18th-century red-brick farmhouse with 20th-century alterations.

References

External links

Villages in Lincolnshire
Civil parishes in Lincolnshire
East Lindsey District